Hugh News (June 1931 – April 2012) was an Irish nationalist politician.

News grew up in Silverwood, Armagh, and studied at St Colman's College, Newry before working as a pharmacist and publican in Lurgan.  In 1964, he was elected to Lurgan Borough Council, serving for three years as a member of the Independent Citizens' Association.  He joined the Social Democratic and Labour Party (SDLP) in the early 1970s, and was elected for the party to Craigavon Borough Council in 1973, holding his seat at each election until he stood down in 1989

News was elected in Armagh at the 1973 Northern Ireland Assembly election, and held his seat on the Northern Ireland Constitutional Convention in 1975 and at the 1982 Assembly election.  At the last two elections, he narrowly beat fellow SDLP member Paddy O'Hanlon for the final seat.

In October 1973, armed men, believed to be loyalist militants, threw a grenade at News' bar, injuring a customer and a barman.  He continued to run the pub until his retirement in 1998.

In his spare time, News also served as national vice-president of the Ancient Order of Hibernians through the 1970s.

News died in late April 2012.

References

1931 births
2012 deaths
People from Lurgan
Members of Craigavon Borough Council
Independent politicians in Northern Ireland
Social Democratic and Labour Party politicians
Members of the Northern Ireland Assembly 1973–1974
Members of the Northern Ireland Constitutional Convention
Northern Ireland MPAs 1982–1986